No Remorse Records was a German heavy metal record label. It was the original record label of heavy metal band Blind Guardian.

Discography
NRR 1001: Blind Guardian - Battalions of Fear
NRR 1002: Dimple Minds - Blau auf'm Bau
NRR 1003: Grinder - Dawn for the Living
NRR 1004: Dimple Minds - Trinker an die Macht
NRR 1005: Heavens Gate - In Control
NRR 1006: Blind Guardian - Follow the Blind
NRR 1007: Grinder - Dead End
NRR 1008: Lawdy - Outlaw Invasion
NRR 1009: Sacrosanct - Truth Is What Is
NRR 1010: Pyracanda - Two Sides of a Coin
NRR 1011: Grinder - The First EP
NRR 1012: Heavens Gate - Open the Gate and Watch
NRR 1013: Wardance - Heaven Is for Sale
NRR 1014: Blind Guardian - Tales from the Twilight World
NRR 1015: Centaur - Mob Rules the World

See also
List of record labels

References

No Remorse Records at Discogs

German record labels
Record labels established in 1988
Record labels disestablished in 1990
Heavy metal record labels